Simon Balle All-through School is a co-educational secondary school, sixth form, and most recently primary school with academy status located in Hertford, Hertfordshire, England. Its name derives from Simon de Balle, one of two deputies (MPs) sent to Parliament to represent the Borough in 1298. He had owned Balls Park, which is adjacent to the school's location. The school converted to academy status on 1 November 2013. Its logo symbolizes that the school is key to Hertford since its logo is a replica of the Hertfordshire logo, except in green, matching the school's primary colour.

Simon Balle Primary school

Due to the overcrowding of other primary schools Simon Balle built a primary school, which was finished in the summer of 2015, it is now known as the “Simon Balle All-through School”, as it offers education from the age of 4 with a reception class up until students leave year 11 at age 16 or stay on until age 18 in sixth form.

Notable former pupils
George Ezra – singer-songwriter and musician.
Nicolas Hamilton - racing driver

References

External links
 Official School Website

1957 establishments in England
Academies in Hertfordshire
Educational institutions established in 1957
Secondary schools in Hertfordshire
Buildings and structures in Hertford
Primary schools in Hertfordshire